Yuji Nishino (西野 勇士, born March 6, 1991) is a Japanese professional baseball pitcher for the Chiba Lotte Marines of Nippon Professional Baseball (NPB).

Nishino was added to the Japanese baseball team's roster for the 2014 Major League Baseball Japan All-Star Series.

References

External links

Living people
1991 births
Baseball people from Toyama Prefecture
Japanese baseball players
Nippon Professional Baseball pitchers
Chiba Lotte Marines players